Road 64 is a road in western Iran connecting Mehran Border to Khuzestan.

References

External links 

 Iran road map on Young Journalists Club

64
Transportation in Ilam Province
Transportation in Khuzestan Province